Antiwan Henning Jr. (born September 9, 2001) is an American football wide receiver for the Michigan Wolverines.

Early years and high school career
Henning attended Lincoln-Way East High School in Frankfort, Illinois. During the 2019 season, he tallied 835 receiving yards and 648 rushing yards, scored 29 touchdowns, and was selected as the Gatorade Player of the Year in Illinois. 247Sportss rated him as the No. 1 prospect in Illinois.

College career
Henning committed to Michigan and was the school's highest-ranked recruit in the 2020 class.  He debuted for Michigan during the COVID-shortened 2020 season, appearing in six games.

As a sophomore in 2021, he appeared in all 14 games for Michigan, playing as a return specialist and wide receiver. Against Western Michigan on September 4, he scored his first collegiate touchdown, gaining 74 yards on a reverse. Against Maryland on November 20, he took a lateral from Michael Barrett and returned it 81 yards for a touchdown. Against Ohio State on November 27, he tallied 107 all-purpose yards and scored Michigan's first touchdown on a jet sweep. For the season, he averaged 9.4 yards on 29 punt returns. He was also named to the 2021 Academic All-Big Ten team.

In the spring of 2022, Michigan coach Jim Harbaugh said they planned to use Henning in a Deebo Samuel-esque role. In July 2022, Pro Football Focus rated Henning as one of its 31 breakout candidates for 2022.

On September 17, Henning returned a punt 61 yards for a touchdown against UConn. It was Michigan's first punt return for touchdown since 2019. Having returned a kickoff for a touchdown in 2021, he became the fourth Michigan player (joining Steve Breaston, Desmond Howard, and Dave Raimey) to return both a punt and a kickoff for a touchdown. During the 2022 regular season, Henning returned 25 punts for 184 yards, an average of 7.36 yard per return. He also returned eight kickoffs for 163 yards, an average of 20.38 yards per return.

References

External links
 Michigan Wolverines bio

2001 births
Living people
American football wide receivers
Michigan Wolverines football players